In arithmetic and algebra, the fourth power of a number n is the result of multiplying four instances of n together. So:

n4 = n × n × n × n

Fourth powers are also formed by multiplying a number by its cube. Furthermore, they are squares of squares.

The sequence of fourth powers of integers (also known as biquadrates or tesseractic numbers) is:
 
0, 1, 16, 81, 256, 625, 1296, 2401, 4096, 6561, 10000, 14641, 20736, 28561, 38416, 50625, 65536, 83521, 104976, 130321, 160000, 194481, 234256, 279841, 331776, 390625, 456976, 531441, 614656, 707281, 810000, ... .

Properties
The last digit of a fourth power in decimal can only be 0 (in fact 0000), 1, 5 (in fact 0625), or 6.

Every positive integer can be expressed as the sum of at most 19 fourth powers; every integer larger than 13792 can be expressed as the sum of at most 16 fourth powers (see Waring's problem).

Fermat knew that a fourth power cannot be the sum of two other fourth powers (the n = 4 case of Fermat's Last Theorem; see Fermat's right triangle theorem). Euler conjectured that a fourth power cannot be written as the sum of three fourth powers, but 200 years later, in 1986,  this was disproven by Elkies with:

 .

Elkies showed that there are infinitely many other counterexamples for exponent four, some of which are:

 (Allan MacLeod)
 (D.J. Bernstein)
 (D.J. Bernstein)
 (D.J. Bernstein)
 (D.J. Bernstein)
 (Roger Frye, 1988)
 (Allan MacLeod, 1998)

Equations containing a fourth power
Fourth-degree equations, which contain a fourth degree (but no higher) polynomial are, by the Abel–Ruffini theorem, the highest degree equations having a general solution using radicals.

See also 
Square (algebra)
Cube (algebra)
Exponentiation
Fifth power (algebra)
Sixth power
Seventh power
Eighth power
Perfect power

References

Figurate numbers
Integers
Number theory
Elementary arithmetic
Integer sequences
Unary operations